The Continental Tire Road Race Showcase at Road America (formerly the Road America 500) is a sports car race held at Road America in Elkhart Lake, Wisconsin. The event began in 1950, and in 1951 was added to the SCCA National Sports Car Championship. Following a spectator death at the 1952 Watkins Glen Grand Prix, racing on open roads was discouraged, and the race went into hiatus until 1955, when a permanent circuit was opened. In 1963, the race shifted to the new United States Road Racing Championship, until the USRRC's demise in 1968. After an 11-year hiatus, the IMSA GT Championship revived the event in 1979. The race was shortened to 2 hours in 1992. After a return to a 500-km distance, the race was cancelled in 1994. It was revived once again in 2000, by the Grand American Road Racing Championship, to a 500-mile distance. The race was an American Le Mans Series event from 2002 until 2013, run at varying race distances of either 2 hours and 45 minutes or 4 hours. In 2014 the race joined the schedule of the WeatherTech SportsCar Championship after the merger of the American Le Mans Series and the Rolex Sports Car Series.
 
Porsche has won the event nine times, most recently in 2007.  Augie Pabst, Chuck Parsons, and Geoff Brabham have each won three times as drivers.

Winners

Elkhart Lake road circuit

Road America

 Scheduled for two 250-kilometer heats, the first heat was cancelled due to heavy rain.
 A 300-kilometer GTP/Lights race and 200-kilometer GTO/GTU/AAC race were held, totaling 500 kilometers.

References

External links
United SportsCar Championship official site
World Sports Racing Prototypes: SCCA Nationals archive
World Sports Racing Prototypes: USRRC archive
World Sports Racing Prototypes: IMSA archive
World Sports Racing Prototypes: Grand-Am archive
World Sports Racing Prototypes: ALMS archive
Racing Sports Cars: Road America archive
Ultimate Racing History: Road America archive
Audi Allroad

 
Recurring sporting events established in 1950
1950 establishments in Wisconsin